The 1934 Ohio Bobcats football team was an American football team that represented Ohio University as a member of the Buckeye Athletic Association (BAA) during the 1933 college football season. In their 11th season under head coach Don Peden, the Bobcats compiled a 4–4–1 record and outscored opponents by a total of 116 to 67.

Schedule

References

Ohio
Ohio Bobcats football seasons
Ohio Bobcats football